Snowbell is a common name for several plants and characters and may refer to:

Soldanella, a genus of herbaceous plants in the family Primulaceae, native to Europe
Styrax, a genus of shrubs and small trees in the family Styracaceae, native to Asia and the Americas
Snowbell, a cat from the Stuart Little film series